Hunghom Bay Centre is a private housing estate in Baker Street, Hung Hom, Kowloon, Hong Kong, near Whampoa Garden. It consists of 11 residential towers with a total of 814 residential units, which were developed by Hutchison Whampoa and completed in 1978. It approached Hung Hom Bay and old Hung Hom Ferry Pier until Hung Hom Bay was reclaimed in 1990s.

Hunghom Bay Centre received an Honorable Mention at the 1980 Hong Kong Institute of Architects Annual Awards.

References

Private housing estates in Hong Kong
CK Hutchison Holdings
Hung Hom
Buildings and structures completed in 1978